Donald John Deacon (June 2, 1912 – August 1, 1943) was a Canadian ice hockey winger who played parts of three seasons for the Detroit Red Wings of the National Hockey League from 1936 to 1940.

On December 25, 1943, Deacon fell from his second floor balcony while having a Christmas party with family and friends. He was pronounced dead on impact. After analyzing Deacon's body, it was determined that Deacon fell on his head, fracturing his skull and killing him immediately. It was also reported that Deacon was intoxicated. His death was ruled as an accident. He was 31 years old.

Career statistics

Regular season and playoffs

See also
 List of ice hockey players who died during their playing careers

References

External links
 

1912 births
1943 deaths
Canadian military personnel from Saskatchewan
Canadian Army personnel
Accidental deaths from falls
Accidental deaths in British Columbia
Alcohol-related deaths in Canada
Canadian Army personnel of World War II
Canadian expatriate ice hockey players in the United States
Canadian ice hockey forwards
Cleveland Barons (1937–1973) players
Detroit Olympics (IHL) players
Detroit Red Wings players
Ice hockey people from Saskatchewan
Indianapolis Capitals players
Pittsburgh Hornets players
Regina Pats players
Sportspeople from Regina, Saskatchewan